Arrhyton ainictum, the Las Tunas racerlet or Cuban Island racer, is a species of snake in the family Colubridae. It is found in Cuba.

References 

Arrhyton
Reptiles described in 1981
Reptiles of Cuba